The Socialist Workers League was a group of Israeli Trotskyists, founded in 2002 and dissolved in 2004. The SWL was built as a result of a split initiated by Trotskyists who were part of the Israeli Committee for One Democratic Republic of Palestine. The prominent member of the SWL was Yossi Schwartz, former member of the leadership of the Canadian section of the International Communist League (Fourth Internationalist), known as the international Spartacist tendency, the Trotskyist League (Canada). The Trotskyists, led by Schwartz, believed that only a program that struggles for a socialist Palestinian republic can unite the Palestinian Arab workers and peasants of the region.

History
With two comrades, Schwartz founded a faction named Militants for the Fourth International. The MFI contained only 5-6 comrades.

After a short factional struggle, the MFI decided to build itself as independent organization. The newborn SWL contacted the Partido Obrero, the Workers' Party (Argentina)  tendency in Argentina, the leading section of the Co-ordinating Committee for the Refoundation of the Fourth International. The SWL became the official section of the CCRFI. It published a monthly journal, The Militant.

During 2002 and the beginning of 2003, the SWL attempted to launch a movement for one and democratic republic with Abnaa el-Balad movement. The failure to build it, led the minority faction to conclude that it must ally with the Communist Party of Israel and call for voting to its political front, Hadash. The majority, led by the PO comrades, claimed that the 2003 elections should be boycotted.

As a result of the factional struggle, the SWL (minority) changed its views and accepted the right of the Israeli people for self-determination, along the perspective of socialist federation of the Middle East with full cultural and national rights to all minorities. In June 2003, the SWL (minority) decided to become political supporter of the International Marxist Tendency led by Alan Woods and the late Trotskyist politician Ted Grant. It changed its name to In Defense of Marxism Circle (IDMC), starting entry work within the Communist Party of Israel and later on within the Labor Party (Israel).

The SWL was dissolved and does not exist any more. In July 2007, the IDMC comrades left the International Marxist Tendency following the former's demand for military support in the Hamas movement and their refusal to accept the work of the IMT within the Pakistan Peoples Party, adopting some of the politics of the SWL again but upholding the state capitalism analysis of the USSR and changing their name to the Internationalist Socialist League.

Communism in Israel
Political organizations based in Israel
Trotskyist organizations in Asia